This article is the discography of English pop musician Daniel Boone. It includes his releases as Peter Lee Stirling, but excludes his work with bands such as Hungry Wolf and Rumplestiltskin and his work with David Garrick as The Warlord, The Intergalactic Orchestra and Technique. For his work with Tommy Bruce and the Bruisers, see there.

Albums

Studio albums

Compilation albums

Singles

Notes

References

External links

Discographies of British artists
Pop music discographies